Boughrara is a coastal town in central-eastern Tunisia. During the Roman occupation of North Africa, Boughrara was known as Gigthis.

See also

Gigthi

Populated places in Tunisia
Populated coastal places in Tunisia
Medenine Governorate